Wandana Heights is a residential suburb of Geelong, Victoria, Australia. Suburban development of the suburb commenced in the 1980s which due to the current high property prices in Australia, and the fluctuation of prices in previous years housing development has been sporadic with periods where there has been no new constructions, punctuated with occasional spurts. Another factor affecting the growth of the area is the monetary value for plots, which is significantly higher than the neighbouring suburb of Highton due to the very expansive views of the surrounding district.

Facilities include the Wandana Heights Reserve, with tennis courts, a playground, and ubiquitous football oval. Drewan Park is also in the suburb, with a lookout which provides a panoramic view of Geelong, Corio Bay and the surrounding districts.

In 2008 extensive works were underway as part of the Geelong Ring Road.

References

Suburbs of Geelong